Walter Price (fl. 1571), of Monaughty, Radnorshire, was a Welsh politician.

He was a Member (MP) of the Parliament of England for Radnorshire in 1571.

References

Year of birth missing
Year of death missing
16th-century Welsh politicians
People from Radnorshire
English MPs 1571